NK Vrapče is a Croatian football club founded in 1938, in Zagreb's neighbourhood Vrapče which is situated in west part of the city. Its characteristic color is yellow.

In seasons of 1992–1997, NK Vrapče played in Croatian Second League and that was the biggest success of this club.

External links
 
NK Vrapče at Nogometni magazin 

Football clubs in Croatia
Association football clubs established in 1938
Football clubs in Zagreb
1938 establishments in Croatia